ASPAC FC are a Beninese football club based in Cotonou. They currently play in the Benin Premier League. In 2010, the club won the Benin Premier League title for the first time in their history.

Achievements
Benin Premier League: 2
2010, 2012

Benin Cup: 1
2008

Performance in CAF competitions
CAF Champions League: 1 appearance
2011: First Round

Notable players
 Raimi Kola

Managers
 Jean Marc Nobilo
  Alain Gaspoz (2009–)

References

Football clubs in Benin
Association football clubs established in 1968
Cotonou